A cariole (also spelled carriole) was a type of carriage used in the 18th and the 19th century. It was a light, small, two- or four-wheeled vehicle, open or covered, drawn by a single horse. The term is also used for a light covered cart or a dog-drawn toboggan. The name is French, derived from the Latin carrus, vehicle.

See also

Carryall
Carriage

References
The Cariole. The New York Times, September 14, 1884.

Carriages